Paul Withington (January 25, 1888 – April 2, 1966) was an American football player and coach. He was the head coach at the University of Wisconsin–Madison for a season in 1916 and at Columbia University for part of one season in 1924.

Withington attended Harvard University, where he played football as a guard and center. He received his bachelor's degree from Harvard in 1909, and his Doctor of Medicine degree from Harvard Medical School in 1914. Withington  is notable as the only coach in collegiate history to be a head coach at the same time as working as a doctor.  In 1914, he also published the book "The Book of Athletics".

Withington married Constance Restarick in Boston, Massachusetts, on April 18, 1911. In 1917, he entered the U.S. Army Medical Corps. He was in charge of athletics at Camp Funston, playing on the football team. After the war, Withington remained in Germany with the 89th Division and the Army of Occupation.  Football teams were established and a championship playoff system established.  Withington was the team captain for the 89th Division, which won the A.E.F. championship. Withington was awarded the Legion of Merit by the U.S. Navy in 1945, the Silver Star, the French Croix de Guerre, the British Mons Star, World War I victory ribbon, the Army of Occupation of Germany ribbon, the American Defense ribbon and the Pacific Asiatic ribbon with star. He was also an honorary lieutenant in the Royal Medical Corps of the British Army.

Head coaching record

*Percy Haughton coached the first 5 games of the season.

References

External links
 
 

1888 births
1966 deaths
American football centers
American football guards
Columbia Lions football coaches
Harvard Crimson football coaches
Harvard Crimson football players
Harvard Medical School alumni
Punahou School alumni
Wisconsin Badgers football coaches
United States Army personnel of World War I
Sportspeople from Escondido, California
Recipients of the Silver Star
Recipients of the Legion of Merit
United States Army Medical Corps officers
Military personnel from California